The history of Walmart, an American discount department store chain, began in 1950 when businessman Sam Walton purchased a store from Luther E. Harrison in Bentonville, Arkansas, and opened Walton's 5 & 10. The Walmart chain proper was founded in 1962 with a single store in Rogers, expanding outside Arkansas by 1968 and throughout the rest of the Southern United States by the 1980s, ultimately operating a store in every state of the United States, plus its first stores in Canada, by 1995. The expansion was largely fueled by new store construction, although the chains Mohr-Value and Kuhn's Big K were also acquired. The company introduced its warehouse club chain Sam's Club in 1983 and its first Supercenter stores in 1988. By the second decade of the 21st century, the chain had grown to over 11,000 stores in 27 countries.

1960s and 1970s 

At some point, Sam Walton made the decision to achieve higher sales volumes by keeping sales prices lower than his competitors by reducing his profit margin. Inspired by the successes of other discount department store chains, Walton opened the second store in Harrison, Arkansas, that year. Responsible for the purchase and maintenance of signage, Walton's assistant, Bob Bogle, came up with the name "Wal-Mart" for the new chain. By 1967, the company grew to 24 stores across the state of Arkansas, and had reached $12.6 million in sales, and by 1968, the company opened its first stores outside of Arkansas in Sikeston, Missouri, and Claremore, Oklahoma.

The company's first stock split occurred in May 1972 at a market price of $47. By this time, Walmart was operating in five states: Arkansas, Kansas, Louisiana, Missouri and Oklahoma, and expanded into Tennessee in 1973, and Kentucky and Mississippi in 1974. As the company expanded into Texas in 1975, there were 125 stores with 7,500 associates, and total sales of $340.3 million.

By 1977, Walmart expanded into Illinois and made its first corporate acquisition, assuming ownership and operation of the Mohr-Value stores, which operated in Missouri and Illinois. This was followed by the acquisition of the Hutcheson Shoe Company in 1978. In the same year Walmart also branched out into several new markets, launching its pharmacy, auto service center, and jewelry divisions.

1980s and 1990s 

In 1981, Walmart expanded into the southeastern US market, opening stores in Alabama, Georgia and South Carolina, and acquiring 92 Kuhn's Big K stores. They expanded into Florida and Nebraska in 1982.

In April 1983, the company opened its first Sam's Club store, a membership-based discount warehouse club, in Midwest City, Oklahoma. They also expanded into Indiana, Iowa, New Mexico, and North Carolina and implemented "people greeters" in all of their stores. The first stores opened in Virginia in 1984.

In 1985, with 882 stores with sales of $8.4 billion and 104,000 associates, the company expanded into Wisconsin and Colorado, and the first stores opened in Minnesota in 1986.

By the company's 25th anniversary in 1987, there were offices to track inventory, sales, and send instant communication to their stores. Continuing their technological upgrades, they had equipped 90% of their stores with barcode readers by 1988, to further assist in keeping track of their large inventory.

In February 1988, company founder Sam Walton stepped down as chief executive officer, and David Glass was named to succeed him. Walton remained on as Chairman of the Corporate Board of Directors, and the company also restructured their senior management positions, elevating a cadre of executives to positions of greater responsibility.

Also in 1988, the first Wal-Mart Supercenter was opened in Washington, Missouri. The supercenter concept features everything contained in an average Walmart discount store, in addition to a tire and oil change shop, optical center, one-hour photo processing lab, portrait studio, and numerous alcove shops such as banks, cellular telephone stores, hair and nail salons, video rental stores, and fast food outlets.

By 1988, Wal-Mart was the most profitable retailer in the United States, though it did not outsell K-Mart and Sears in terms of value of items purchased until late 1990 or early 1991.

By 1988, Walmart was operating in 27 states, having expanded into Arizona, Michigan, Ohio, West Virginia, New Jersey, and Wyoming. By 1990, they expanded into California (which marked Walmart officially becoming a fully nationwide retailer), Nevada, North Dakota, Pennsylvania, South Dakota, and Utah. The Walmart Visitor's Center also opened this year on the site of Sam Walton's original store.

The 1990s saw an era of furious growth on an unprecedented scale and the incorporation of several new ideas and technology into the business.

In 1990, US sales had quadrupled to $32 billion over the previous five years  and Walmart acquired The McLane Company, a food service distributor, which was later sold to Berkshire Hathaway in 2003.

In 1991, the company expanded into Connecticut, Delaware, Maine, Maryland, Massachusetts, New Hampshire, and New York. Walmart expanded worldwide this year, with the opening of their first store outside the United States in Mexico City. They also acquired Western Merchandisers, Inc. of Amarillo, Texas. 1991 also saw the launch of the Sam's American Choice brand of products "Made in America" initiative, to stimulate American suppliers to produce more products and lower the price.

On March 17, 1992 US President George H. W. Bush presented Sam Walton with the Presidential Medal of Freedom. Walton died on April 5, 1992. His eldest son, S. Robson Walton, succeeded him as Chairman of the corporate board of directors, on April 7, 1992. This year, Walmart had a presence in 45 states which by this time expanded into Idaho, Montana, and Oregon, as well as Puerto Rico.

In 1993, the Walmart International Division was formed with Bobby Martin as its president. The company also expanded into Alaska, Hawaii, Rhode Island and Washington. Their stores also achieved the billion-dollar sales mark in one week in December 1993.

In 1994, the National Advertising Review Board challenged the Walmart slogan, "Always the low price. Always," contending that it implied that Walmart's prices were always the lowest and could mislead some shoppers. In response, Walmart adopted a new slogan, "Always low prices. Always."

Also in 1994, the Code Adam program was instituted in Walmart stores. That same year, Walmart acquired 91 PACE Membership Warehouse clubs from Kmart and 122 Woolco stores in Canada in 1994. In addition, it opened 3 value clubs in Hong Kong, and had 96 stores in Mexico.

By 1995, Walmart had 1,995 discount stores, 239 Supercenters, 433 SAM'S CLUBS and 276 international stores with sales at $93.6 billion (including US sales of $78 billion) and 675,000 associates. Walmart expanded into its final state (Vermont), and also expanded into South America, with three new units in Argentina and five in Brazil.

The company entered the Chinese market in 1996 through a joint-venture agreement. Also, Walmart in Dickson City that had opened in 1992 closed due to falling debris (because it was built onto the side of a mountain) which hit the back of the store.In 1997, Walmart replaced Woolworth on the Dow Jones Industrial Average. The company had its first $100 billion sales year, with sales totaling $118.1 billion. Also this year, they acquired 21 Wertkauf stores in Germany, and introduced their OneSource nutrition centers.

In 1998, Walmart introduced the Neighborhood Market concept at three stores in Arkansas. Neighborhood Market stores are predominantly  grocery stores, and are intended to attract customers with easier parking, less crowded aisles, and quicker checkout compared to an average grocery store. Internationally Walmart enters South Korea by acquiring 4 stores operated by Korea Makro.

Also in 1998, Walmart launched its Wal-Mart Television Network, a vast, in-store advertising network showing commercials for products sold in the stores, concert clips and music videos for a recording artist's media, trailers for upcoming movie releases, and news.

The Asda chain in the United Kingdom became a subsidiary in 1999, and is the second largest chain in the UK after Tesco.

21st century 

In 2000, Lee Scott was named president and CEO and US sales had doubled to $156 billion since 1995. That same year, Walmart was ranked fifth by Fortune magazine on its Global Most Admired All-Stars list and in 2003 and 2004, it was named as the most admired company in America.

In 2002, Walmart entered the Japanese market by acquiring a minor stake in Seiyu Group, who would become a wholly owned subsidiary of Walmart by 2008.

In 2005, Walmart had $312.4 billion in sales, more than 6,200 facilities around the world, including 3,800 stores in the United States and 3,800 international units, and more than 1.6 million associates employed worldwide. Their US presence had grown so rapidly that there were only small pockets of the country that remained further than 60 miles away from the nearest Walmart.  Approximately 138 million customers visited Walmart stores each week all over the world. Their corporate philanthropy efforts also assisted the US hurricane relief efforts with $18 million in cash donations. Through a purchase of stock in Central American Retail Holding Company (CARHCO), Walmart also entered the countries of Guatemala, El Salvador, Honduras, Nicaragua, and Costa Rica.

On May 22, 2006, Walmart announced the sale of its 16 stores in South Korea to Shinsegae Co, which rebranded the stores to E-Mart. Then on July 26, 2006 Walmart announced a complete pull-out from the German market; all existing 85 stores were sold to the Metro Group, which rebranded most of them to Real (hypermarket).

On September 12, 2007, for the first time in 13 years, Walmart introduced new advertising with the slogan, "Save Money Live Better," instead of  "Always Low Prices, Always." It commissioned Global Insight for the ads and the report  stated that as of 2006, the retailer saves American families $2,500 yearly (up 7.3% from $2,329, 2004). The new research found that the reduction in price levels due to Walmart resulted to savings for consumers of $287 billion in 2006, equivalent to $957 per person and $2,500 per household.

On June 30, 2008, Walmart unveiled the company's new logo, which stylized the name as "Walmart". A spark, a symbol chosen to represent Walmart associates, replaces the star. In early 2009, Walmart entered Chile by acquiring Distribucion y Servicio D&S SA. In May 2009 Walmart entered into a 50/50 partnership with Bharti to gain access to the Indian market.
Also in 2008, a Walmart that was built atop a landfill in Garfield Heights, OH closed due to toxic fumes.

On February 22, 2010, the company confirmed it was acquiring the video streaming company Vudu, Inc. for an estimated $100 million.

In June 2011, Walmart acquired 51% of Massmart Holdings. This acquisition gives the company access to the African countries of: South Africa, Botswana, Ghana, Lesotho, Malawi, Mauritius, Mozambique, Namibia, Nigeria, Swaziland, Tanzania, Uganda and Zambia.

The Massmart acquisition received final governmental approval in early 2012. The single store Mauritius was closed in January 2012.

In June 2014, Walmart employees went on strike in several major cities in the United States.

In light of recent events, amid the COVID-19 pandemic, in the last eighteen months, as of July 2021; Walmart has displaced all cashiers at smaller stores and neighborhood locations. Such locations, only have Scan-and-Go self-checkout stations. Walmart Supercenter locations also will see replacement of cashiers by 2025, as mainly 25% of cashiers work in most locations, while other 75% cashier stalls are closed all day.

New ventures 
In late 2005, Walmart designed two experimental stores, one in McKinney, Texas and the other in Aurora, Colorado, which featured wind turbines, photovoltaic solar panels, biofuel-capable boilers, water-cooled refrigerators, and xeriscape gardens.

In March 2006, Walmart sought to appeal to a more affluent demographic, with the opening of a new supercenter in Plano, Texas, at the corner of Park Blvd. and the Dallas North Tollway which was intended to compete against stores that some viewed as more upscale and appealing. The new store features wooden floors, wider aisles, a sushi bar, a coffee/sandwich shop (with free Wi-Fi Internet access), a Subway, and higher-end items such as microbrew beer, expensive wines, and high-end electronics. The exterior sports the less-common hunter green background behind the Walmart letters instead of the trademark blue.

In response to the popularity of organic food supermarkets, such as Whole Foods and Wild Oats, Walmart announced plans in May 2006, to increase the amount of organic food available in its stores. They announced that both conventionally grown and organic versions of certain products would be available, and the price of organic versions would not be more than 10% over the price of conventionally grown products. Since Walmart is one of the nation's largest grocery retailers, there was some concern expressed that their push to lower prices would not be sustainable for inexpensive organic food.

Legal trouble 
Over the last decade or so Walmart has become involved in numerous lawsuits for a variety of reasons.  The majority of the suits are class action lawsuits in which employees are suing for unpaid wages.  They have also run into numerous discrimination cases in which employees are suing for being profiled out of money or out of jobs.  For example, there were two separate cases, one in 2004 and one in 2005, in which black employees were suing two different Walmarts for denying them jobs based on race. These became so popular that the Reverend Jesse Jackson intervened and spoke during both of the proceedings.  There are also many lawsuits in which women are suing Wal-Mart for discriminating against them.  In one article written in 2004 USA today mentioned 32 different lawsuits that involved women suing Walmart. But still Walmart has prevailed. All of this has not had any effects on Walmart financially however, according to Fortune 500, Walmart still had $351 billion in revenue ($11 billion in profit) in 2007, a new high for the corporation.

On December 3, 2008, the family of Walmart service worker Jdimytai Damour, who was killed by a stampede of shoppers frantically entering a Walmart store in Valley Stream, New York, on Black Friday (November 28), filed a wrongful death lawsuit against the corporation; Damour's family alleged Walmart of encouraging a mass number of customers to come to the store simultaneously. In addition, the Occupational Safety and Health Administration cited Walmart for "...inadequate crowd management following the Nov. 28, 2008, death of an employee at its Valley Stream, New York, store. The worker died of asphyxiation after being knocked to the ground and trampled by a crowd of about 2,000 shoppers who surged into the store for its annual 'Blitz Friday' pre-holiday sales event."
  The company went on to spend an estimated $2 million in legal fees fighting OSHA's $7,000 fine, because it apparently wished to prevent OSHA from establishing a precedent that would enable OSHA to influence Walmart's crowd control measures in the future.

Countries of operation 
, Walmart stores operate in Botswana, Canada, Chile, China, Costa Rica, El Salvador, Ghana, Guatemala, Honduras, India, Kenya, Lesotho, Malawi, Mexico, Mozambique, Namibia, Nicaragua, Nigeria, South Africa, Swaziland, Tanzania, Uganda, the United States (including Puerto Rico) and Zambia.

See also 
 Criticism of Walmart
 List of Walmart brands
 List of assets owned by Walmart

References

External links

 – About Walmart's ownership of Seiyu Group

Walmart
Walmart